Oriana Scheuss (born 7 February 1972 in Teufen, Appenzell Ausserrhoden) is a Swiss sport shooter. She competed at the 2000 Summer Olympics in the women's 50 metre rifle three positions event, in which she tied for 17th place, and the women's 10 metre air rifle event, in which she tied for 36th place.

References

1972 births
Living people
ISSF rifle shooters
Swiss female sport shooters
Olympic shooters of Switzerland
Shooters at the 2000 Summer Olympics